Phaenarete is a monotypic moth genus in the subfamily Arctiinae. Its single species, Phaenarete diana, is found in Panama and Costa Rica. Both the genus and species were first described by Herbert Druce in 1896.

References

Arctiinae